Caldimonas is a genus of bacteria from the family of Comamonadaceae.

References

Comamonadaceae
Bacteria genera